William Briton or Breton (died 1356) was a Breton Franciscan theologian. John Bale places his death in 1356 at Grimsby.

Works
Briton's works, enumerated by Bale, are principally concerned with dialectics. He is remembered, however, for his 'Vocabularium Bibliæ,' a treatise explanatory of obscure words in the Scriptures. The prologue and some other components are in Latin verse. These, with supplemental specimens, have been printed by Angelo Maria Bandini. Extracts are given by Ducange.

References

Year of birth missing
1356 deaths
French Franciscans
14th-century Breton people
French male writers
Writers from Brittany